Tinnin is a surname. Notable people with the surname include:

Glenna Smith Tinnin (1877–1945), American suffragist
Nelson B. Tinnin (1905–1985), American politician
Nick Tinnin, American politician

English-language surnames